The 2014 AFF Futsal Championship is the 11th edition of the tournament which will be held in Shah Alam, Malaysia from 19 to 27 September 2014. Ten from twelve member nations of the ASEAN Football Federation (AFF) will enter. All matches were played at the Stadium Melawati.

Venue

Group stage 
All times are Malaysia Time (MST) – UTC+8

Group A

Group B

Knockout stage

Semi-finals

Third place play-off

Final

Winner

Goalscorers 
10 goals
  Jetsada Chudech

7 goals
  Bambang Bayu Saptaji
  Jaelani Ladjanibi
  Pyae Phyo Maung (1)
  Pyae Phyo Maung (3)

6 goals
  Daniel Fogarty
  Jordan Guerreiro
  Ardy Dwi Suwardy
  Wanlop Pansomsua

5 goals

  Andri Kustiawan
  Caisar Octavianus
  Muhammad Fariq Mohammad
  Atirat Sittisak
  Phung Trong Luan
  Le Quoc Nam

4 goals
  Tobias Seeto
  Aung Aung
  Kongla Lekkla
  Piyapan Ratana
  Pham Duc Hoa

3 goals

  Gregory Giovenali
  Jordan Mundell
  Syahidanysah Lubis
  Fhandy Permana
  Saiful Aula Ahmad
  Muhamad Fitri Muhamad Yatim
  Khin Zaw Linn
  Naing Ye Kyaw
  Nyein Min Soe
  Sorasak Poonjangreed
  Wiwat Thaijaroen
  Manuel Varela Da Silva Pereira
  Tran Long Vu

2 goals

  Jarrod Basger
  Dean Lockhart
  Nur Ali
  Soulichanh Phasawaeng
  Akmarulnizam Mohd Adris
  Mohd Khairul Effendy Mohd Bahrin
  Mohd Asmie Amir Zahari
  Htet Myat Naing
  Kittipong Sonsuwan

1 goal

  Nathan Niski
  Wade Giovenali
  Clayton Musumeci
  Bruno Pivato
  Muhd Dhiyaulhak Awang Abd Rahim
  Mohammad Sharifuddin Marji
  Andriansyah Agustin
  Indra Kurnia Purnomo
  Ahmad Zulfikar
  Saysana Inhtavong
  Panida Sinthapaseuth
  Vilakone Vannavong
  Saiful Nizam Mohd Ali
  Mohammad Shami Abdullah Sani
  Kyaw Soe Moe
  Patrick Bocobo
  Jayson Cutamora
  Jake Morallo
  Floriano Pasilan
  Andres Pinga
  Michael Reyes
  Jovanie Simpron
  Daryoush Rey Zandi
  Kawin Wiboonratchakit
  Piyanat Nusaya
  Juvito Correia Da Silva
  Jose G. De Jesus C. Vong
  Fernando Baptista Xavier
  Pham Thanh Dat
  Ly Khanh Hung
  Nguyen Bao Quan
  Quoc Nam
  Ngo Ngoc Son
  Thai Huy

Own goal 

1 own goals
  Ak Muhammad Naqib Pg Timbang (for )
  Robert Cañedo (for )
  Kanison Phoopun (for )

Team statistics 
This table will show the ranking of teams throughout the tournament.

References

External links
 Old website (Archived)
 Official website

AFF Futsal Championship
Futsal
Futsal
International futsal competitions hosted by Malaysia
AFF